Gail Lyon is a film producer since 1997.

Filmography 
She was a producer in all films unless otherwise noted.

Film

Television

External links 
 Gail Lyon at Hollywood.com
 

American film producers
Living people
Year of birth missing (living people)